Edsvalla is a locality situated in Karlstad Municipality, Värmland County, Sweden with 1,016 inhabitants in 2010.

References 

Karlstad
Populated places in Värmland County
Populated places in Karlstad Municipality